Stanford Hall is a grade II* listed 18th-century English country house in Nottinghamshire, England, in Stanford on Soar just north of Loughborough. It is home to the Defence and National Rehabilitation Centre (DNRC).

History
The manor of Stanford, complete with its stone manor house, was sold in 1661 by the Raynes family to a London alderman, Thomas Lewes (died c. 1702). He was succeeded by his grandson Francis Lewis (c. 1692 – 1744), who was an MP and High Sheriff of Nottinghamshire for 1713–14. The estate then passed to the fourth and last generation of Leweses, Charles Lewes, who died with no heir. After him it passed by marriage to the Dashwood family, of whom the first to occupy the property was Charles Vere Dashwood. He commissioned William Anderson of Loughborough to rebuild the house in brick between 1771 and 1774. The house is constructed in red brick with ashlar dressings, with a hipped slate roof topped with a painted balustrade, built in two storeys with a 7 bay frontage. It then descended in the Dashwood family to Charles Lewes Dashwood, who sold it in 1887 to Richard Ratcliff, a brewer from Burton-on-Trent.

Ratcliff employed the local architect W.H. Fletcher to make substantial changes to the house, which included building new 2 storey wings flanking the main block and a new service wing. The house passed on his death in 1898 to his son, also Richard, By 1928 the owner was Richard Snr.'s granddaughter Kathleen, who had married Lawrence Kimball.

Sir Julien Cahn
In 1928 Sir Julien Cahn purchased the Hall from the Kimballs for £70,000 (equivalent to £ as of ). 

Here Cahn commissioned the architect Percy Morley Horder to build a cricket pitch, nine-hole golf course, bowling green, large trout lake, sea lion pool, penguin pool, lido, tennis court and thatched pavilion, an enormous outdoor heated swimming pool with coral walls holding fountains and artificial caves added to the fantastic wooded parkland and formal gardens.

The largest addition was a theatre designed by Cecil Aubrey Masey built in 1937 for £73,000 (equivalent to £ as of ) which seated 352 people.  The walls were decorated with murals by Beatrice MacDermott. It comprised a raked auditorium, orchestra pit and Wurlitzer organ  which can be raised and lowered during performances. The organ was made for Théâtre de la Madeleine, Paris. It was purchased by Sir Julien Cahn for £20,000 and enlarged when it was installed.

The house was extensively remodelled over the next decade under the direction of Sir Charles Allom, principal of arguably the finest of the large interior decorating concerns, White Allom Ltd. Together with Queen Mary, Sir Charles advised on the redecoration of Buckingham Palace and had many multi-millionaire clients, such as Henry Clay Frick, whose Fifth Avenue town house now houses the Frick Collection and whose decoration by White Allom is highly regarded. The same is true of Stanford Hall.

Stanford Hall retains most of the superb interior structures and installations of Cahn's day, though most of the art moderne marble bathrooms were removed in the 1960s. The furnishings selected with Sir Charles Allom were of the highest quality. The inclusion of many fine antiques, and the theming of the rooms by date and country gave the impression of a house that had evolved over time. By 1940 it was one of the finest and most luxurious of small country houses in the United Kingdom. Cahn died in the White Allom panelled library in 1944, when part of the house was being used for the rehabilitation of wounded soldiers.

Bomber crash
In 1941 a Blenheim bomber crashed onto the cricket pitch in foggy conditions; no one died in the incident.

Co-operative College
The hall was purchased for £54,000 in 1945 (equivalent to £ as of ), by the Co-operative Union to house its Co-operative College.

Raynsway Properties 2001–2007
The Co-operative College relocated to Holyoake House in Manchester in 2001 and sold Stanford Hall to Raynsway Properties, who planned to convert it into luxury apartments and also build a 147 Bedroom hotel in the grounds.

Chek Whyte 2007–2011
In March 2007 the Hall was sold by Leicester-based Raynsway Properties for £6.25 million to Chek Whyte Industries, who planned to convert it and built a £60m retirement village within the grounds. In March 2009, the grounds hosted the English schools cross country championships. In October 2009, after the fall in property prices because of the recession, Chek Whyte obtained an Individual Voluntary Arrangement (IVA) in order to avoid bankruptcy.

Defence and National Rehabilitation Centre (DNRC)
In October 2011 the Hall and its grounds were purchased on behalf of Gerald Grosvenor, 6th Duke of Westminster as a potential site for a ‘Defence and National Rehabilitation Centre’ (DNRC).  The Duke, who served in the Territorial Army  since the age of 20 and was committed to supporting military welfare, led a major donor fund raising campaign to cover the capital costs of the Defence element of the proposed new establishment.

On 13 June 2013, Rushcliffe Borough Council "resolved to grant planning permission... for the redevelopment of the Stanford Hall estate as the potential site for the DNRC". On the 10 July 2014 HM Government announced that it had granted approval for the establishment of DNRC at Stanford Hall. Work started on the £300m three-year project on 24 August 2015.

The 7th Duke of Westminster handed over the DNRC facility to the Nation at a Gifting Ceremony held on the Estate on 21 June 2018.  The Centre was received by the Prime Minister, Theresa May in the presence of the Duke of Cambridge.

References

External links 
DNRC
Stanford Hall - DNRC estate redevelopment
History of Stanford Hall Theatre
The DiCamillo Companion - Stanford Hall
Stanford Hall Outdoor Pool
The Co-operative College - Origins and Development

Country houses in Nottinghamshire
Grade II* listed buildings in Nottinghamshire